The North Dakota State College of Science (NDSCS) is a public college in Wahpeton, North Dakota. It is part of the North Dakota University System. Founded in 1903 by provision of the state constitution, the State College of Science offers degrees, certificates, and diplomas in more than 80 academic options in traditional career and technical studies as well as the liberal arts. The college also offers a variety of distance education and online courses.

Campus 
The main campus of the North Dakota State College of Science is located in Wahpeton, N.D. A second site, referred to as NDSCS-Fargo, is located on 19th Avenue North in Fargo, N.D.

Main Campus 

The main campus sits on 128 acres of land and consists of 35 campus buildings. The campus is located by 8th Avenue to the south and 4th Street to the east. Old Main — the centerpiece of the NDSCS campus for generations — has been listed on the National Register of Historic Places since 1984. Designed by architect John M. Coxhead, Old Main was built in 1891 as the original home of Red River Valley University. The North Dakota Academy of Science opened in the building's west wing in 1903. Old Main sits on the north side of the main oval, where many campus activities take place.

NDSCS-Fargo 
NDSCS-Fargo is a campus of North Dakota State College of Science. Located across from the Fargodome on 19th Avenue North in Fargo, NDSCS-Fargo serves as the home to academic programming and non-credit training.

Academics 
NDSCS offers academic options in the following career clusters:
 Agriculture, Food and Natural Resources
 Architecture and Construction
 Automotive and Diesel Technology
 Business, Management and Administration
 Finance
 Education and Training
 Health Science
 Hospitality and Tourism
 Human Services
 Information Technology
 Law, Public Safety, Corrections and Security
 Manufacturing
 Marketing, Sales and Services
 Science, Technology, Engineering and Mathematics (STEM)
 Transportation

Athletics 
The North Dakota State College of Science's sports teams are known as the Wildcats. The NDSCS Wildcats are members of the National Junior College Athletic Association (NJCAA).

NDSCS's intercollegiate teams include:
 Women's Basketball
 Men's Basketball
 Volleyball
 Softball
 Football
 Baseball

Notable alumni
 Gene Anderson, professional wrestler
 Rick Berg, Republican former U.S. Representative for North Dakota's at-large congressional district
 Randy Boehning, Republican member of the North Dakota House of Representatives
 Jerry Gaetz, North Dakota state senator
 James Kerzman, Republican former member of the North Dakota House of Representatives
 Kim Koppelman, Republican member of the North Dakota House of Representatives
 Paul Marquart, DFL member of the Minnesota House of Representatives
 Scott Matthew, NDSSS 1987 Southwestern University, former professional basketball player, Winnipeg Thunder, WBL. Municipal judge in Texas.
 Donald Grant Nutter, 15th Governor of Montana
 Tim Purdon, 18th U.S. Attorney for the District of North Dakota
 Creighton Leland Robertson, 9th bishop of the Episcopal Diocese of South Dakota
 Gilmore Schjeldahl, businessman and inventor
 Andre Smith, Former professional basketball player 2007-2016. Most notably in Italy and Turkey.  .
 Russell T. Thane, Republican former member of the North Dakota State Senate

See also 
 Old Main (North Dakota State College of Science)
 Death of Andrew Sadek

References

External links
 Official website
 Official athletics website

Public universities and colleges in North Dakota
Educational institutions established in 1903
Buildings and structures in Richland County, North Dakota
Education in Richland County, North Dakota
1903 establishments in North Dakota
NJCAA athletics
Wahpeton, North Dakota